Ichsan Kurniawan (born 24 December 1995) is an Indonesian professional footballer who plays as a central midfielder for Liga 1 club Dewa United.

Club career
He made his Sriwijaya first-team debut on 18 September 2013 as starting line-up, which ended 6–1 defeat against Barito Putera at Demang Lehman Stadium.

International career
In 2014, Ichsan represented the Indonesia U-19, in the 2014 AFC U-19 Championship. He made his debut with Indonesia on 6 September 2016 in a friendly against Malaysia as a substitute.

Career statistics

Club

International

Honours

Club 
Sriwijaya U-21
 Indonesia Super League U-21: 2012–13

Sriwijaya
 East Kalimantan Governor Cup: 2018

References

External links 
 Ichsan Kurniawan at Liga Indonesia
 

Indonesian footballers
1995 births
Living people
Sportspeople from South Sumatra
Liga 1 (Indonesia) players
Liga 2 (Indonesia) players
Sriwijaya F.C. players
Borneo F.C. players
Muba Babel United F.C. players
BaBel United F.C. players
PSG Pati players
Persija Jakarta players
Dewa United F.C. players
Indonesia youth international footballers
Indonesia international footballers
Association football midfielders
21st-century Indonesian people